Bruno Matykiewicz (born 21 April 1959 in Stonava) is a Polish former weightlifter from Zaolzie who represented Czechoslovakia.

He hailed from Stonava (Stonawa) and lived in Albrechtice (Olbrachcice) and is a member of local MK PZKO Olbrachcice.

In 1981 he earned two silver medals at the World and European Championships in Lille. In 1982 Matykiewicz earned two bronze medals at the World and European Championships in Ljubljana. Several weeks after this championships he made his personal best by lifting in total 412.5 kg (185+227.5). He was forced to end his promising career prematurely in 1983 due to health problems. He was also a six-time champion of Czechoslovakia in several age categories.

References 
 

1959 births
Living people
Polish male weightlifters
Czechoslovak male weightlifters
People from Karviná District
Polish people from Zaolzie